This is the discography of Cantopop artist Sally Yeh.

1980

1. 春天的浮雕 Embossing Spring

 春天的浮雕 Embossing Spring 
 星 Stars
 山之旅 Mountain Tribe
 The Olive Tree 
 Bright Bright Bright 
 一根火柴 A Piece of Firewood
 寄語 Sending a Message
 玫瑰花園 Rose Garden (Instrumental)
 一根火柴 A Piece of Firewood (Instrumental)

1981

2. 愛的詩篇 Love Poem

 跟我來 Follow Me
 失去夢的少女 The Girl Who Lost Her Dream
 有人告訴我 Someone Told Me
 飛行翼 Flying Wings
 燈下的回憶 Memories Under the Light
 Don't Cry For Me Argentina 
 我願 I Am Willing
 愛的詩篇 Love Poem
 琴韻星空 A Piece of Firewood (Instrumental)
 快樂時光 A Time of Happiness
 Fame

1982

3. 愛的出發點 The Beginning of Love

 愛的出發點 The Beginning of Love
 青春笑笑笑 Youth Laugh Laugh Laugh
 誓言 Swear
 找回童年 Finding Youth Once Again
 夢一樣的詩 Dream-like Poem
 The Dolphin Song 
 長髮的姑娘 Long-Haired Lady
 一封情書 A Love Letter
 “飄零的落花” 電影主題曲
 春風若解愁滋味
 思情夢意
 Evergreen 

4. 答應我 Promise Me

 答應我 Promise Me
 誰讓愛遲到 Who Let Love Be Late
 我問春風 I Ask Spring Wind
 離愁 Leaving Worries
 歸程 Journey Home
 微笑的漩渦
 楓葉紅
 愛有始有終 Love Has Beginning and End
 夢的途中 Midway to Dream
 當我擁有你 Once I Have You
 Lay All Your Love On Me

1983

5. 再好的離別也會思念 (國/英)

 請你不要說 Don't Say Anything
 就等你來 Waiting For You To Come
 都是你 All Because of You
 海之夢 The Sea's Dream
 再好的離別也會思念
 Reality 
 友誼 Friendship
 雨中的愛情 Love In The Rain
 問你 Asking You
 戀愛羅曼史
 晚鐘
 Rainbow Connection

1984

6. 葉蒨文 Sally (Cantonese/English)

 零時十分 Ten Past Midnight
 瘋女 Crazy Woman
 愛得太盡
 將來那天 That Day In The Future
 情話綿綿
 She Works Hard For The Money 
 星與雲 Stars and Clouds
 新雙星情歌
 千金難得美人心
 可能 Possibly
 Never Gonna Let You Go (林子祥 合)

1985

7. 長夜 My Love Goodnight (Cantonese)

 長夜 My Love Goodnight
 願死也為情 Willing to Die for Love
 迷惑 Seduce
 誰負我痴情
 晚風 Evening Breeze
 200度 200 Degrees (cover of Madonna's Material Girl)
 只想擁有你 Only Want to Own You
 變幻裡前行
 故夢  Old Dream
 晚風 (Mandarin) Evening Breeze

1986

8. Cha Cha Cha (Cantonese/Mandarin)

 我要活下去 I Want To Keep Living
 後悔流淚 Tears of Regret
 躲也躲不了 (Mandarin) Can't Hide
 以前 Before
 迷離 Mysterious
 Cha Cha Cha
 千粒星 (林子祥 合) A Thousand Stars
 寒煙翠
 苦哀
 阿信的故事 The Story of Ah Sun

1987

9. 甜言密語 Sweet Words (Cantonese)

 甜言密語 Sweet Words
 海旁獨唱 Solo By The Sea (cover of Madonna's La Isla Bonita)
 這份情 This Love
 為何 Why
 舊照片 Old Photographs
 乾一杯 Cheers (林子祥 合) (cover of The Checkers' Song For U.S.A.)
 衝動 Impulse (cover of Madonna's True Blue)
 地獄天堂 Hell, Heaven
 可否想一想 Please Think It Over
 一點意見 A Bit of Suggestion

10. 祝福 Blessing (Cantonese)

 紅玫瑰 Red Rose
 為何是你 Why You
 黎明不要來 Dawn, Don't Come
 深深擁著我  Hug Me Tightly
 從頭開始 Start Over (cover of The Pretenders' Don't Get Me Wrong)
 同你同我 With You, With Me
 Over the Rainbow 
 祝福 Blessing
 美夢在心中 Dream in My Heart
 遺忘了 Forgotten
 只有它 Only It
 答案 Answer
 Only You

1989

11. 面對面 Face To Face (Cantonese)

 一生一次 One Life, One Chance
 最愛是我家 Love My Family Most
 面對面 Face To Face
 往昔夢境 Past Dreams
 最後一吋 Last Inch
 慢慢地更加好 Slower the Better
 只愛一次 Only Love Once
 海闊天空 Wide Sky
 從前到現在 From Then Until Now
 我只有知道 I Only Know
 命運我操縱 Control My Destiny
 隨緣 Going
 淺醉一生 Drunk for Life

1990

12. 珍重 (Cantonese)

 珍重 Take Care
 他 He
 諾言 Promise
 太早還是太遲 Too Early Or Too Late
 未了解 Not Understood
 焚心以火 Burn Heart With Fire
 回歸自然 Return to Nature
 一雙一對 Star-Crossed Lovers
 我走我路 I Follow My Own Path
 一觸即發 One Shot

13. 秋去秋來 Fall Has Come and Gone (Cantonese)

 秋去秋來 Fall Goes and Comes
 等待 Waiting
 如果有緣 If Destined
 愛是現在 Love Is Now
 我再說一遍 I'll Say It Once More
 尋覓 Seeking
 難捨難分 Hard to Leave and Separate
 在夜裡寂寞時 Alone At Night
 永遠的溫柔 Forever Tenderness
 第一晚 The First Night

1991

14. 關懷 (Cantonese)

 憑千個心 With a Thousand Hearts
 信自己 Believe Myself (cover of Janet Jackson's Love Will Never Do (Without You)  (杜德偉 合)
 只因有愛 Only Because of Love
 又再一個人 Alone Again
 仍是愛你一個 Still Only Love You
 無盡暖柔情 "Endless Warmth and Tenderness" (cover of Jose Mari Chan's "Please Be Careful with My Heart" (duet with Regine Velasquez) (雷有曜 合)
 仍夢見你,仍夢見我 Still Dream of You, Still Dream of Me
 美麗的苦酒 Beautiful, bitter wine
 快一些 Faster
 關懷 Care
 春風秋雨 Spring Wind Autumn Rain

15. 瀟灑走一回 Cool Walk (國/英)

 我的愛和別人一樣 My Love Is The Same As Everyone Else
 忘了說再見 Forgot To Say Goodbye
 我們的愛這麼難 Our Love Is So Difficult
 他 Him
 夢醒還是夢 Wake Up from Dream is Still Dream
 瀟灑走一回 Cool Walk; 1991 CTS drama 京城四少 theme song
 黎明不要來 Dawn, Don't Come
 焚心以火 Throw Heart To Fire
 最盼望是愛 Most Desired is Love
 Only You 
 晚風 Night Wind

1992

16. 紅塵 Red Ashes (Cantonese / English)

 情人知己 Lover and Friend
 紅塵 Red Ashes
 愛到分離仍是愛 (林子祥 合)
 真女人 Real Woman
 女兒心 A Girl's Heart
 Crazy Love
 曾經心痛 Heartbroken In The Past
 一輩子溫柔 Lifetime Of Tenderness
 I'm Always Dreaming Of You (feat. Tommy Page) 
 暖流 Warm Rapids
 午夜窗前 in Front of the Window at Midnight

17. 真心真意過一生 (Mandarin)

 曾經心痛 Heartbroken In The Past
 因為寂寞 Because Lonely
 With All My Heart 
 不了情 Endless Love
 驛動的心
 真心真意過一生
 向傷心告別 Parting with Sorrow
 人間有情 Love Is Everywhere
 哭砂
 其實你不懂我的心 Actually You Don't Understand My Heart
 Over The Rainbow 
 真心真意過一生 (熱勁狂飆版)
 真心真意過一生 (瀟灑自在版)

1993

18. 與你又過一天 Another Day With You (Cantonese/Mandarin)

 與你又過一天 Another Day With You
 你今天要走 You're Leaving Today
 理想中的人 The Ideal Person
 亂世桃花 (林子祥 合) Peach Flower in the Warring World
 走火入魔 (Cover of Whitney Houston's Queen of the Night)
 女人的眼淚 A Woman's Tears (Mandarin)
 今生不再為你等 I Can't Wait For You Again In This Lifetime
 我知道我會後悔 I Know I Will Regret It
 原來愛過以後 (周潤發 合)
 枉費心思 Wasted Intent
 永遠青春可愛 Forever Young and Adorable
 與你又過一天 (柔情版) Another Day with You

19. 明月心 Moon's Heart

 落花 Fallen Flowers
 女人的眼淚 A Woman's Tears
 永遠 Forever
 我該微笑還是哭 Should I Smile Or Cry
 瀟灑走一回 (Remix) y
 明月心 Moon's Heart
 誰的心讓我停泊
 幾度花落時 Times Flowers Fell
 迷失 Lost
 多情的路 The Path of Love

1994

20. 女人的弱點 A Woman's Weakness (Cantonese)

 女人的弱點 A Woman's Weakness (cover of Chage and Aska's "You are Free")
 我的愛對你說 Tell You My Love(國)
 Lonely Girl
 等愛的心 The Heart That Waits For Love
 完全是你 It's All You
 春天的天氣 The Weather of Spring
 這次是不是最後 This Time Is Not The Last
 別人的情歌 (Cover of Toni Braxton's Another Sad Love Song)
 不見不散 I'll See You Then
 人生其實很簡單 Life Is Actually Very Simple (Mandarin)
 兩個結局 Two Endings

21. 離開情人的日子 The Day Lovers Split

 離開情人的日子 The Day Lovers Split (Cover of Chage and Aska's "You are Free")
 等愛的女人 The Woman That Waits For Love
 人生其實很簡單 Life Is Actually Very Simple
 失戀一次上了癮 Addicted to Breaking-Up
 愛上你我從不後悔 I Never Regretted Loving You
 朋友 Friends
 完全是你 It's All You
 曾愛過你 Loved You Once
 就讓我哭吧 Let Me Cry
 我見過你的眼神 I Saw Your Eyes
 歡笑之歌 A Happy Song (馬浚偉 合) (Cantonese)

1995

22. Simple Black & White (Cantonese)

 深呼吸 Deep Breath (Cover of Toni Braxton's Breathe Again)
 當一切別離我 When Everything Leaves Me
 我有我的信用卡 I Have My Credit Card
 與你傾訴 Telling You
 父母天地 Parents' World
 自信 Self-Confidence
 明白 Understand
 你不會內疚 You Won't Feel Guilt
 願愛得肯定 Let Love Be Certain
 若有緣份 If There is Destiny

23. 真心

 真心 True Hearted
 我心深處 Deep In My Heart
 心灰 Disintegrated Heart
 對你還是愛 Still Love You
 心甘情願 Willingly
 時代 Time Period
 不會有誰能讓我後悔 No One Can Make Me Regret
 我愛的是你 The One I Love Is You
 女人 Women
 藍天 Blue Sky

1996

24. True (Cantonese)

 其實你知 Actually, I Know
 談情說愛 Talking About Love (feat. Sammi Cheng)
 願意 Willing
 不死身 Immortal Body
 福氣 Luck
 在我身旁 By My Side (李偉菘 合)
 自信 Self-Confidence
 遠方的心 Far Away Heart
 傷痛 Hurt
 知心 Understanding

25. 燭光

 燭光 Candlelight
 如復薄水
 依賴 Dependent
 思念 Thought
 心滿意足 Satisfied
 我自己飛 I'll Fly On My Own
 一個人 One Person
 在乎 Care (feat. Anthony Lun)
 流水帳
 笑看人生 Laughing At Life

1997

26. 蒨意 (Cantonese)

 麻煩女人 Troublesome Women
 活過 Having Lived
 蒨意
 紫色 Purple
 娛樂自己 Entertain Myself
 男與女 Men and Women (feat. Jackie Chan)
 自強不息 Grow Stronger
 難得是今晚 Cherish Tonight
 小宇宙 Little Universe
 幸運兒 Lucky One
 感謝 Thanks

27. 關心 Concern (Cantonese)

 是你忘了我的美 It's You Who's Forgotten My Beauty
 關心 Concern
 直覺 Sense
 任性
 翩翩起舞 Drift into Dance
 從容 Spoil
 女人的眼淚是珍珠 A Woman's Tears Are Pearls
 只願為你付出 Only Willing to Give for You
 失去重心 Losing Balance
 月光沙灘 Moonlit Beach

1998

28. 繫我心弦 My Heart Will Go On (Cantonese)

 繫我心弦 (Cover of Celine Dion's My Heart Will Go On)
 愛不只一次 Love Not Only Once
 你要記住 You Have to Remember
 姊姊妹妹 Sisters
 糊塗 Confused
 改變故事 Changing The Story
 浮現 Surface
 屋 House
 思 Thought
 仙島 Island of Angels
 觀點與角度 Perspective and Angle
 楊眉女子

2002

29. 你聽到 You Heard

 傷逝
 華麗緣
 你聽到了沒有 Did You Hear Me (Mandarin)
 堅強
 渡假
 新生命 A New Life
 最難唱的情歌 The Hardest Love Song To Sing
 心水清
 我有兩雙肩膊
 傷逝 (Mandarin)

2003

30. 出口 Inside Out

 (不要) 關電視 (Don't) Turn Off The TV
 只有一次 Only Once
 相愛的第二天 The Second Day of Falling In Love
 愛的可能 The Possibility of Love
 蘭花草
 童年 Years of Youth
 不要對他說 Don't Tell Him
 愛上一個不回家的人 Loving Someone Who Won't Come Home
 未來的主人翁
 用心良苦
 我是不是你最疼愛的人 Am I The One You Love Most
 但是又何奈

Yeh, Sally
Pop music discographies